Shah Muhammad Abul Hussain (1 April 1937 – 21 November 2022) was a Bangladesh Nationalist Party politician and a former Member of Parliament from the Mehendiganj Upazila, Barisal-4.

Career
Hussain worked as a collector in the Bangladesh Customs. He was elected into the Bangladesh parliament in the June 1996 Bangladeshi general election. He was re-elected into parliament in the elections in 2001. He served as the State Minister of Finance and Planning in the Second Khaleda Cabinet.

Death
Hussain died in Dhaka on 21 November 2022, at the age of 85.

References

1937 births
2022 deaths
People from Barisal District
Bangladesh Nationalist Party politicians
State Ministers of Finance (Bangladesh)
State Ministers of Planning (Bangladesh)
7th Jatiya Sangsad members
8th Jatiya Sangsad members
6th Jatiya Sangsad members